Antonia Mayr (born 8 September 1949) is an Austrian luger. She competed at the 1972 Winter Olympics and the 1976 Winter Olympics.

References

1949 births
Living people
Austrian female lugers
Olympic lugers of Austria
Lugers at the 1972 Winter Olympics
Lugers at the 1976 Winter Olympics
People from St. Johann im Pongau District
Sportspeople from Salzburg (state)